Dr Chidi Ngwaba MB, BS (sometimes known as Dr Chidi) is a British physician who specialises in lifestyle medicine including reversing illnesses such as type-2 diabetes, hypertension, autoimmune diseases and obesity. He is an international speaker on health and wellness and has appeared on television including BBC One's Food: Truth or Scare, ITV's Good Morning Britain, and Sky News' SkyPapers. Ngwaba is of Nigerian descent. He was selected as the Brexit Party candidate for the parliamentary seat of Croydon North in the 2019 general election.

References

Living people
1970 births
English people of Nigerian descent
20th-century British medical doctors
21st-century British medical doctors
Reform UK parliamentary candidates
People from Croydon